Reinevatn is a lake in the municipality of Bykle in Agder county, Norway. The dam's spillway flows into the nearby river Skargjesåni. The Snjoheinuten mountain lies just to the northeast of the lake.

See also
List of lakes in Aust-Agder
List of lakes in Norway

References

Bykle
Lakes of Agder